Louis Cole is an American multi-instrumentalist and singer-songwriter, best known as the co-founder of the electronic/avant-pop/jazz-funk duo Knower. He is also a solo artist and has released six solo albums: Louis Cole (2010), Album 2 (2011), Time (2018), Live Sesh (2019), LIVE 2019 (2020), and Quality Over Opinion (2022). It is speculated that he is a member of the avant-garde musical duo Clown Core.

Early life and education
Louis Cole was born in Los Angeles to a family with musical roots. His father plays jazz piano, while his mother played bass. Cole started drumming when he was 8. He graduated in Jazz Studies at USC Thornton School of Music in 2009.

Musical career
After graduating from USC in 2009, Cole was encouraged by his friend Jack Conte to put music videos on YouTube, including one called "Bank Account", which showcased a split-screen of him playing keyboards, drums, and singing. This video catapulted him into the public awareness, as it was posted on social media by various celebrities and musicians such as John Mayer, Charlie Day, and Björk.

After doing several other short songs and uploading them to YouTube, Cole wanted to focus more on writing longer material. He co-founded Knower with another Jazz Studies graduate, Genevieve Artadi. In 2010, he released both his self-titled solo album and the debut album for Knower. After releasing his second solo album, he focused more on Knower, producing three other albums. In the meantime, Cole co-wrote "Padded Cell" for Seal's 2015 album 7, and together with Artadi, got featured on Snarky Puppy's Family Dinner – Volume 2. In 2017, he co-wrote two songs for Thundercat's album Drunk. This led to signing a contract with Flying Lotus' label Brainfeeder and releasing his third solo album through the label in 2018. The album featured appearances by Artadi, Thundercat, Dennis Hamm and Brad Mehldau. Cole also appeared on Thundercat's 2020 Grammy Award winning album It Is What It Is, performing on a song called "I Love Louis Cole", which was dedicated to him.

In 2020, Cole wrote an exclusive song for Grand Theft Auto Online called "Planet X", which was added to the FlyLo FM radio station through The Cayo Perico Heist update. Knower's song "Fuck the Makeup, Skip the Shower" was previously featured on the same radio station. "Planet X" was later included in Cole's fourth studio album Quality Over Opinion, which was released on October 14, 2022 via Brainfeeder. Another song in the album, "Let it Happen", was nominated for the Grammy Award for Best Arrangement, Instrumental and Vocals.

It is speculated that Cole and saxophonist Sam Gendel are behind Clown Core, a surrealist musical duo of two anonymous clowns who blend grindcore, jazz, and electronic music.

Style and songwriting
Cole is a classically-trained jazz musician and multi-instrumentalist who plays drums, keyboards, guitar and bass, sings, and produces his material. His work contains elements from a diverse range of music genres such as jazz, funk, pop, avant-garde, electronic, lo-fi (early) and grindcore (with Clown Core). Cole is a "bedroom" musician who doesn't like working in a professional recording studio. He practices drums for four hours a day, and writes music for seven hours a day. Cole feels his mission is to write his own favorite music, and he "never [tries] to make [his] music accessible to anyone." He is known for using strange and counterintuitive chord progressions. His lyrics often include humor and vulgarity, and his music features home-made videos. Cole is more creative during the early hours of the day, and documents this phenomenon on his song, "The Weird Part of the Night".

Influences and recognition
Cole's influences include his father, Stevie Wonder, James Brown, Aretha Franklin, The Beach Boys, Boards of Canada, Nate Wood, The Beatles, and Skrillex, among others. Cole is also influenced by science fiction and video game sounds and visuals, and notes that the music of classic Nintendo games and Tron shaped Knower's aesthetic:

Cole is best friends with Thundercat, who has called him "one of Los Angeles's greatest musicians". Flying Lotus has also expressed admiration for Cole on Twitter, calling him "super inspirational" during the writing of his album Flamagra. Bob Mintzer has described Cole as "the paradigm for today's musician". Will Schube of Passion of the Weiss has compared Cole's "auteur approach" to that of another Los Angeles musician, Ariel Pink. Emma Roller of The Brick House Cooperative has described Cole as "a dopey yet cerebral jazz composer and percussionist who whaps out brain-meltingly complex beats with Terminator-like precision".

Discography

Solo albums
 Louis Cole (2010)
 Album 2 (2011)
 Time (2018)
 Live Sesh (2019)
 LIVE 2019 (2020)
 Quality Over Opinion (2022)

With Knower
 Louis Cole and Genevieve Artadi (2010)
 Think Thoughts (2011)
 Let Go (2013)
 Life (2016)

Purportedly with Clown Core
 Clown Core (2010)
 Toilet (2018)
 Van (2020)
 1234 (EP; 2021)

As a guest
 7 by Seal (2015)
 Family Dinner – Volume 2 by Snarky Puppy (2016)
 Drunk by Thundercat (2017)
 WILKES by Sam Wilkes (2018)
 Hill Climber by Vulfpeck (2018)
 It Is What It Is by Thundercat (2020)

References

External links
 
 
 

American multi-instrumentalists
Jazz-funk musicians
American male jazz musicians
American electronic musicians
American pop musicians
American funk musicians
American drummers
American jazz drummers
American keyboardists
American male singer-songwriters
21st-century American musicians
American YouTubers
Jazz-pop musicians
Living people
American singer-songwriters
Music YouTubers
American male jazz composers
American jazz composers
21st-century jazz composers
Year of birth missing (living people)
Brainfeeder artists
Ninja Tune artists